Vessel is the third studio album by American musical duo Twenty One Pilots, which was released on January 8, 2013. It is the band's first album released via Fueled by Ramen, and is their major-label debut album. Vessel debuted at number 58 on the Billboard 200 chart, but reached number 21 in 2016. As of July 2019, the album has sold over two million equivalent album units in the U.S. All of its tracks have been certified at least Gold by the RIAA, which made Twenty One Pilots the first group or artist to achieve this feat with two separate albums.

Background
Twenty One Pilots signed to Fueled by Ramen in 2012. In the summer of 2012, the duo released the Three Songs EP, which featured the tracks "Guns for Hands", "Migraine", and "Ode to Sleep". On December 18 2012, the album was made available for streaming via Entertainment Weekly. Vessel was released through Fueled by Ramen on January 8, 2013.

Production
The songs "Ode to Sleep", "Holding on to You", "House of Gold", "Car Radio", "Guns for Hands", and "Trees" were taken from their previous independent album, Regional at Best, and re-recorded for Vessel; as a result, the former project was pulled from distribution by the band's label. Joseph had composed Regional at Best "not knowing whether or not people were going to hear it" and viewed Vessel as an opportunity to complete these songs. Joseph revealed that he first attempted to record "Trees" in high school. 

Recording for Vessel took place at Rocket Carousel Studio, located in Los Angeles, California with Greg Wells producing. Wells provided additional synths, keyboards and programming. Wells mixed the album, while Ian McGregor helped with recording. Mastering was performed by Howie Weinberg and Dan Gerbarg at Howie Weinberg Mastering, also in Los Angeles.

The album cover features the duo's paternal grandfathers. The man on the left is Dun's grandfather Earl Owen Dun, who died shortly after the album's release, and the man on the right is Joseph's grandfather Robert O. "Bobby" Joseph, who died on March 17, 2018.

In a fan interview, Joseph spoke on the meaning behind the album's name, saying that a vessel (our body) is an object carrying something far more important than the outer shell, and when we die, that is set free and lives on.

Release
On September 11, "Holding on to You" was released as a single. "Lovely" was released as a single in Japan on April 17, 2013, and included as a bonus track on the Japanese edition of Vessel. "House of Gold" was released as a radio single on August 6. On September 15, "Fake You Out" was released as a single. On October 4, the music video for "House of Gold" was released. The video was directed by Warren Kommers. "Car Radio" was released as a radio single on March 18, 2014. 

On January 8, 2023, the album was re-released as a limited edition vinyl boxset. The vinyl was packaged in a metallic silhouetted cover box, included a poster and polaroid collection, and featured bonus tracks. The release was accompanied by a YouTube variety stream celebrating the record's 10th anniversary; the livestream was a partnership and fundraiser for the non-profit Make-A-Wish Foundation where the band raised over $47,000. The vinyl release was met with sales of an all-time high and an unprecedented demand; delivery of all pre-orders is expected to be as early as February 3, 2023.

Critical reception

Vessel received positive reviews upon release. Jason Pettigrew, writing for Alternative Press, praised the album's multi-genre influence: "The major-label debut by Twenty One Pilots traipses across electropop, hip hop and classic pop music—and that's just the first song." In a more negative review, Rolling Stone's Dave DiMartino wrote: "The duo has somehow managed to take the most disagreeable and obnoxious aspects of the past decade's "rap-rock" legacy, throw in some of the most aggravating melodic aspects of Linkin Park and Blink-182, and put together a new album that will surely make you want to decry ever liking rock 'n' roll at least three times before a cock crows."

In May 2015, it was announced the album had sold 265,000 copies in the United States. By July 2016, the album had sold over 569,000 copies in the U.S. As of July 2019, the album has been certified 2x multi-platinum in the U.S. by the RIAA. Each of its songs have also been certified gold or higher, making Twenty One Pilots the first and only band or artist to reach this accomplishment on two non-compilation albums after Blurryface passed the milestone the previous year.

Tour

To help support the album, the band toured internationally throughout the year. In 2014, Twenty One Pilots played a number of music festivals and other events all around the country which focused mainly on the album, such as Lollapalooza, Bonnaroo, Boston Calling, and Firefly. As a result, they took the show requests from different cities and blended them into the Quiet Is Violent World Tour, which began in September 2014, and ended the same year.

Track listing

Vessel 10th Anniversary Vinyl Edition

Side A
"Ode to Sleep"
"Holding on to You"
"Migraine"
"House of Gold"
"Car Radio"
"Semi-Automatic"
Side B
"Screen"
"The Run and Go"
"Fake You Out"
"Guns for Hands"
"Trees"
"Truce"

Side C
"Holding on to You" (live at LC Pavilion)
"Trees" (live at LC Pavilion)
"Guns for Hands" (live at LC Pavilion)
"Migraine" (live at LC Pavilion)
Side D
"Forest" (from Regional at Best)
"Glowing Eyes" (from Regional at Best)
"Kitchen Sink" (from Regional at Best)
"Lovely" (re-recorded version; originally on Regional at Best)

Personnel
Personnel per booklet.

Twenty One Pilots
 Tyler Joseph – lead vocals, ukulele, guitar, bass guitar, piano, keyboards, synthesizers, keytar, programming, production
 Josh Dun – drums, auxiliary percussion (1–11)

Additional personnel
 Greg Wells – additional synthesizers, programming (1–11)

Production
 Greg Wells – producer, mixing
 Tyler Joseph – additional production
 Ian McGregor – recording
 Howie Weinberg, Dan Gerbarg – mastering
 Reel Bear Media, Virgilio Tzaj – art direction, design
 Reel Bear Media – photography
 Rob Gold – art manager
 Josh Skubel – packaging production

Charts

Weekly charts

Year-end charts

Certifications

References
Citations

Sources

External links

Vessel at YouTube (streamed copy where licensed)

2013 albums
Twenty One Pilots albums
Fueled by Ramen albums
Rap rock albums by American artists
Alternative rock albums by American artists
Albums produced by Greg Wells